The Nevis Bungy is a bungee jumping platform in the Southern Alps near Queenstown in New Zealand's South Island. It is the third highest bungee jumping platform in the world at a height of 134 metres. It is suspended by high-tension cords, which are fixed at both ends on either side of the Nevis River valley. Its glass floor allows spectators to watch others jump. This makes it a main tourist attraction for those visiting Queenstown.

The jump

Bungee jumpers usually fall at speeds of over 128 km/h, and the duration of the initial jump (until the tension in the cord pulls you back up for the first time) is about 8 seconds. The second fall is larger than the world's first commercial bungee jump off Karawau Bridge, Queenstown.

Location and access
The site cannot be accessed by any personal vehicles and may only be reached by taking the shuttle from downtown Queenstown at the company's store located at The Station. It is approximately a 40-minute ride along winding mountain roads to reach the site. Location on map 45°03'46.6"S 169°01'43.4"E

References

External links
New Zealand on the web 
Everything Queenstown promotion site

Buildings and structures in Otago
Tourist attractions in Otago
Bungee jumping sites